Mick Spillane (born 8 January 1957) is an Irish former Gaelic footballer.

Born to Maura in Templenoe, County Kerry, he played for his local club Templenoe and at senior level for the Kerry county team in the 1970s and 1980s.  He is a seven-time All-Ireland SFC winner.

Together with his brothers Pat and Tom, the Spillanes hold a record 19 All-Ireland medals between them.

References

1957 births
Living people
All Stars Awards winners (football)
Gaelic football backs
Irish schoolteachers
Kerry inter-county Gaelic footballers
Munster inter-provincial Gaelic footballers
Mick
Templenoe Gaelic footballers
Winners of seven All-Ireland medals (Gaelic football)